David Warner Hagen (October 2, 1931 – September 28, 2022) was a United States district judge of the United States District Court for the District of Nevada from 1993 to 2005.

Education and career
Born in Camden, Arkansas, Hagen was in the United States Air Force from 1949 to 1952. He received a Bachelor of Business Administration from the University of Wisconsin in 1956 and he received a Bachelor of Laws from the University of San Francisco School of Law in 1959. He was in private practice in Berkeley, California, from 1960 to 1962. He was in private practice in Loyalton, California, from 1962 to 1963, and then in Reno, Nevada, until 1993.

Federal judicial service
On October 7, 1993, Hagen was nominated by President Bill Clinton to a seat on the United States District Court for the District of Nevada vacated by Edward Cornelius Reed, Jr. Hagen was confirmed by the United States Senate on November 20, 1993, and received his commission on November 22, 1993. He assumed senior status on November 28, 2003, serving in that capacity until his retirement from the bench on March 31, 2005.

Post judicial service
Hagen worked as a neutral arbitrator, mediator and court special master through Judicial Arbitration and Mediation Services ("JAMS"). In that capacity he arbitrated and mediated all manner of civil litigation, including intellectual property disputes, class-action lawsuits, gold mining claims, employment lawsuits and commercial contracts. He worked nationwide, but primarily in the Reno, Las Vegas, and San Francisco Bay areas. Hagen died on September 28, 2022, in Reno, Nevada.

References

Sources

  at Reno Gazette-Journal

1931 births
2022 deaths
20th-century American judges
21st-century American judges
Judges of the United States District Court for the District of Nevada
Military personnel from Arkansas
People from Camden, Arkansas
United States district court judges appointed by Bill Clinton
University of Wisconsin Law School alumni
Wisconsin School of Business alumni